Orphan School Creek is a tributary of Prospect Creek, located entirely within the City of Fairfield. It starts in Allambie Road Reserve, Bossley Park, on the border with Edensor Park, and flows in a generally eastern direction before emptying into Prospect Creek. The creek is a mostly natural waterway, with only the middle reach flowing through a concrete channel and piped system. As the name suggests, Orphan School Creek was named after an orphan school in the area. It is not to be confused with Orphan School Creek, Sydney.

Crossings
The following roads and railways form crossings over Orphan School Creek. From west to east, following the course of the creek, they are:
Belfield Road
Sweethaven Road
Mimosa Road
L P T Way
Moonlight Road
Hamilton Road
King Road
Cumberland Highway
Sackville Street
Railway Parade
Main Southern Railway

References

See also
Clear Paddock Creek
Prospect Creek
Georges River

Creeks and canals of Sydney